The indigenous ethnic population of the Maghreb region of North Africa are known as Berbers or Amazigh in English. The native plural form Imazighen is sometimes also used in English. While "Berber" is more widely known among English-speakers, its usage is a subject of debate, due to its historical background as an exonym and present equivalence with the Arabic word for "barbarian." When speaking English, indigenous North Africans typically refer to themselves as "Amazigh."

The Numidian, Mauri or Moor, and Libu populations of antiquity are typically understood to refer to approximately the same population as modern Amazigh or Berbers.

Today

Berber 
In Archaic Greece, barbaroi (βάρβαροι), or "barbarian," was an onomatopoeic word to describe languages perceived as harsh, as well as their speakers; "barbar" was an imitation of these languages. Around the beginning of Classical Greece, the term had come to be used for all foreigners and non-Greek speakers, often with negative connotations. Greeks referred to North African tribes as barbaroi, along with other generalized terms, such as "Numidians," and tribal designations. Among the oldest written attestations of the word Berber is its use as an ethnonym in a document from the 1st century AD Periplus of the Erythraean Sea. 

The Greek barbaroi is related to the Arabic word barbar (بربر), "babble noisily" or "jabber", which was used by conquering Arabs to describe indigenous North African peoples, due to the perceived oddness of their language. This usage was the first recorded to refer to indigenous North Africans as the "Berber" collective. Though "Berber" had been used in reference to East Africans as well, it was mostly applied to Maghreb tribes in conquest narratives, and this became the dominant usage of the term.  

Following a period of Islamization, the highly-influential Arab mediaeval writer Ibn Khaldun considered "Berbers" to be their own "race" or "great nation." This idea fell out of use as indigenous North Africans were increasingly marginalized, but was revived by French colonists in the nineteenth century in hopes of dividing the population. 

The English term "Berber" is derived from the Arabic word barbar, which means both "Berber" and "barbarian." Due to this shared meaning, as well as its historical background as an exonym, the term "Berber" is commonly viewed as a pejorative by indigenous North Africans today.

Amazigh 
Amazigh (fem. Tamazight, pl. Imazighen), or "free man," is an endonym for indigenous North Africans otherwise known as "Berber." "Amazigh" is also used in English; the native language plural "Imazighen" is sometimes but not always used as well. There have been efforts by self-identified Amazigh to popularize the term over "Berber," including in English, due to the perceived derogatory nature of the latter. The use of "Amazigh" is particularly common in Morocco, especially among Central Atlas Tamazight, Tarifit and Shilha speakers in 1980. Its usage does not replace that for more specific ethnic groups, such as Kabyle or Chaoui.

Relatedly, the endonym of Berber languages is typically Tamazight, and in English, "Tamazight" and "Berber languages" are often used interchangeably. "Tamazight" may also be used to a specific language, such as Central Atlas Tamazight or Standard Moroccan Amazigh, depending on the context of its usage.

According to Academic Fazia Aïtel, although Amazigh as a term had been used throughout history, its use as a claim on collective indigenous North African identity is more recent. She has pointed to the 1945 poem “Kker a mmis umazigh” (“Rise up Son of Amazigh”) by Mohand Idir Aït Amrane as its first use a cultural claim.

Etymology 
The root word  in the name Amazigh could be related to early Libyco-Berber tribes, which had been referred to as Mazices in some sources. According to Ibn Khaldun, the name  is derived from one of the early ancestors of the Berbers. 

According to the Berber author Leo Africanus,  meant 'free man'; some argued that there is no root of  meaning 'free' in the modern Berber languages. Further, Amazigh also has a cognate in the Tuareg word , meaning 'noble'.

Historical

Libu

Numidians

Moors 

Romans referred to the indigenous tribes of Mauretania as Mauri, or "Moors."

Indigenous North African tribes, along with other populations, were referred to as "Moors" by medieval Europeans.

The historical interchangeability between "Berbers" and "Moors" is a subject of academic inquiry.

See also
 Berber people
 Berber language

References

Name
Etymologies
Ethnonyms